Elizabeth Munnerlyn is Democratic politician from South Carolina. She was a member of the South Carolina House of Representatives from 2011 to 2014. Munnerlyn was previously an assistant solicitor for the fourth circuit.

References

External links
 
Legislative page

Living people
Democratic Party members of the South Carolina House of Representatives
1969 births

Women state legislators in South Carolina